Klavdiya Yakovlevna Mayuchaya (née Lapteva; ; 15 May 1918 – 14 October 1989) was a Soviet track and field athlete who competed mainly in the javelin throw. She was the gold medallist in the event at the European Athletics Championships in 1946 and was the first woman to throw the javelin beyond fifty metres. She was a nine-time Soviet champion across the javelin, discus throw and grenade throw disciplines.

Career

Early career
Mayuchaya joined the Burevestnik sports club in Moscow in 1936 and practised throwing there until in 1945, when she changed to the Dynamo Sports Club and worked with coach Dmitry Markov until the end of her career. Initially a shot putter, she soon focused more on the javelin throw. The following year she defended that title and also improved her best to  – a mark only bettered by Olympic medallist Luise Krüger that season.

In 1944 she was again ranked fourth internationally and won another national title. She also had her best season in the discus throw that year, with her mark of  being a lifetime best and second in the international rankings behind Nina Dumbadze. At the national championships, she was third in the javelin but won her first discus national title.

European champion and unofficial world record
Mayuchaya won her first and only major international title in the 1946 season. She was the foremost javelin athlete that season through her new best of  set that July. She was part of a Soviet medal sweep of the women's throws, alongside Tatyana Sevryokova and Nina Dumbadze. At the Soviet Championships she won both the javelin and grenade throw events.

This made her the first woman ever to throw the implement beyond fifty metres, although it was not officially recognised as the women's javelin throw world record due to the Soviet Union not being a registered member of the International Amateur Athletics Federation. She won her sixth and final javelin title at the 1947 Soviet Championships, which was also the last of her nine national titles across the throws.

Final years
After 1947, the standard of women's throwing in the Soviet Union increased and Mayuchaya faced competition from Smirnitskaya, Galina Zybina and Aleksandra Chudina, among others. She still regularly ranked within the world's top ten from 1948 to 1953. The last national podium finish of her career came in 1952, when she was runner-up to Zybina in the javelin. In her last season of competition in 1954, at the age of 36, she threw  and ranked 16th in the world.

Personal bests
Javelin throw:  (1947)
Discus throw:  (1945)
Shot put:  (1937)

National titles
Soviet Athletics Championships
Javelin throw: 1938, 1939, 1943, 1944, 1946, 1947
Discus throw: 1945
Grenade throw: 1938, 1946

References

1918 births
1989 deaths
People from Saransk
Soviet female javelin throwers
Soviet female discus throwers
European Athletics Championships medalists